Top Chef: Seattle is the tenth season of the American reality television series Top Chef. The season was announced on September 19, 2012, and premiered on November 7, 2012. The competition was initially filmed in Seattle, Washington before moving to Juneau, Alaska for three episodes, and then concluding in Los Angeles, California. Top Chef: Last Chance Kitchen, the web series introduced in the previous season which puts the eliminated contestants against each other in head-to-head challenges to battle for a chance to re-enter the main competition, also returned. The winner continued to compete in the season finale. In addition, viewers could vote each week for chefs eliminated from the Last Chance Kitchen to move on in the "Save a Chef" competition. The winner of the final vote was "saved", and earned a spot in the final round of the Last Chance Kitchen. In the season finale, Kristen Kish was declared the winner over runner-up Brooke Williamson. Sheldon Simeon was voted Fan Favorite.

Contestants
The cast of the tenth season of Top Chef initially consisted of 21 contestants. After the qualifying challenges in the first episode, the pool of chefs was narrowed down to 15. Former Top Chef competitors Josie Smith-Malave (Top Chef: Los Angeles), Chris "CJ" Jacobson (Top Chef: Miami), and Stefan Richter (Top Chef: New York) joined the competition during the second episode.

Eliminated in qualifying rounds

Top 18

Stephanie Cmar returned to compete in Top Chef: New Orleans. Kristen Kish and Brooke Williamson later competed in Top Chef Duels. Williamson, Sheldon Simeon, and John Tesar returned for Top Chef: Charleston. Cmar returned again for Top Chef: All-Stars L.A.

Contestant progress

: The chef(s) did not receive immunity for winning the Quickfire Challenge.
: Due to the qualifying rounds, the show did not use its traditional elimination format until the second episode.
: Former Top Chef contestants CJ, Josie, and Stefan entered the competition following the Quickfire Challenge.
: Due to the poor quality of the dishes served in the Elimination Challenge, no winner was declared.
: Kristen won Last Chance Kitchen and returned to the competition.
 (WINNER) The chef won the season and was crowned Top Chef.
 (RUNNER-UP) The chef was the runner-up for the season.
 (WIN) The chef won the Elimination Challenge.
 (HIGH) The chef was selected as one of the top entries in the Elimination Challenge, but did not win.
 (IN) The chef was not selected as one of the top or bottom entries in the Elimination Challenge and was safe.
 (LOW) The chef was selected as one of the bottom entries in the Elimination Challenge, but was not eliminated.
 (OUT) The chef lost the Elimination Challenge.

Episodes

Last Chance Kitchen
 
</onlyinclude>

References
Notes

Footnotes

External links
 Official website

Top Chef
2012 American television seasons
2013 American television seasons
Television shows set in Seattle
Television shows set in Alaska
Television shows filmed in California
Television shows filmed in Nevada
Television shows filmed in Georgia (U.S. state)
Television shows filmed in Washington (state)
Television shows filmed in Alaska